Erik Martorell Haga (born 26 June 1998) is a Spanish road and track cyclist, who currently rides for Spanish amateur team Baqué Cycling Team. He competed in four events at the 2021 UCI Track Cycling World Championships.

Major results
2019
 2nd  Scratch, National Track Championships
2020
 National Track Championships
3rd Scratch
3rd Individual pursuit
2021
 National Track Championships
1st  Omnium
1st  Individual pursuit
1st  Elimination race
3rd Madison
 UCI Nations Cup
2nd  Elimination race – Hong Kong

References

External links

1998 births
Living people
Spanish track cyclists
Spanish male cyclists
Cyclists from Barcelona